Kinoceras is an extinct genus of cephalopod from the Silurian of North America.

Sources 

 Kinoceras at the Field Museum's Evolving Planet

Prehistoric cephalopod genera
Silurian cephalopods of North America